Old Love may refer to:

Old Love (story), a 1980 short story by Jeffrey Archer
Old Love, a novel by Isaac Bashevis Singer
An Old Love, an East German black-and-white film directed by Frank Beyer
"Old Love", a song by Eric Clapton from Journeyman
"Old Love", a 1969 song by The Intruders
"Old Love", a song by Joe Hertler & The Rainbow Seekers
"Old Love / New Love", a song by Twin Shadow
"Old Love", a song by Michele Brourman and Amanda McBroom